"Side 2 Side" is a song by Three 6 Mafia, which was released as the third official single from the album Most Known Unknown. A music video was released for the song using a remix, and includes appearances by Project Pat and Bow Wow in addition to Three 6 Mafia's existing members (DJ Paul and Juicy J). The single was released through Columbia Records, Sony Urban Music, and Hypnotize Minds.

There is also an alternate video with the main group (including Crunchy Black), set in a strip club.  Xzibit, Travis Barker, Lyfe Jennings and Stevie Williams all make cameo appearances in the remix music video. Three 6 Mafia performs the song on the pilot episode of NBC's Studio 60 on the Sunset Strip.

Official Remixes
 Side 2 Side (Remix) (Feat. Kanye West & Project Pat)
 Side 2 Side (Remix) (Feat. Bow Wow & Project Pat)
 Side 2 Side (Extended Remix) (Feat. Kanye West, Bow Wow & Project Pat)

2006 songs
2006 singles
Dirty rap songs
Bow Wow (rapper) songs
Three 6 Mafia songs
Kanye West songs
Songs written by Juicy J
Songs written by DJ Paul
Songs written by Kanye West
Sony BMG singles
Columbia Records singles